Ivor John Carnegie Brown CBE (25 April 1891 – 22 April 1974) was a British journalist and man of letters.

Biography
Born in Penang, Malaya, Brown was the younger of two sons of Dr. William Carnegie Brown, a specialist in tropical diseases, and his wife Jean Carnegie. At an early age he was sent to Britain, where he attended Suffolk Hall preparatory school and Cheltenham College. After additional private instruction, he was accepted into Balliol College, Oxford, graduating with a double first in classical honour moderations and Literae Humaniores.

Early career
Excelling on the civil service examination, Brown spent two days as a civil servant in the Home Office in 1913 before realising he was unsuited for the job and quit to become a freelance writer. At this time he was involved in left-wing politics, and was a conscientious objector during the First World War. Though he started authoring books at this time, his ability to write quickly and over a wide range of topics soon marked him out for a career in journalism. After writing for The New Age, he received a position in the London office of The Manchester Guardian in 1919.

Drama criticism
Though his contributions ranged over a number of subjects, Brown developed a particular interest in the theatre. He became a drama critic for the Saturday Review in 1923 and was named the Shute lecturer in the art of the theatre at Liverpool University three years later. In 1929, Brown joined The Observer as their drama critic. In the decade that followed, he emerged as the most influential and insightful drama critic in the British press, a status acknowledged in 1939 with his appointment as professor of drama in the Royal Society of Literature and his selection as director of drama for the Council for the Encouragement of Music and the Arts the following year.

Attacks on modernist poetry
Brown made quite a show of his unwillingness to follow fashionable literary and cultural nostrums. Some of his best writings are beautifully crafted and often hilarious polemics on modern poetry, music and manners. This can be seen (sometimes with a startling effect on today's reader) in such works as I Commit to the Flames, in which, for example, he is particularly scathing about Eliot and Pound:
Mr T. S. Eliot offers the public the balderdash of his Waste-Land (pretentious bungling with the English language) and immediately becomes a pundit, bestriding the Atlantic with his cultural messages....our immunity from such poetry continually weakens; it has now been discovered that half-baked intellectuals will worship baby-talk and even persuade other people to pay for it....Gibberish levels all minds....Hence the popularity of modern verse....the source of the trouble is a general flight from reason....belief in the omnipotence of the sub-conscious for faith in self-determination of the will by reason guided.

And again:
....the Prophet Ezra at large among the alphabet, his Ps and Qs in a fine frenzy rolling....Mr. Pound 'uses quotations and translations and reminiscence and single words which are often meant to convey a large burden outside themselves' [here quoting Grigson]. This is one of T. S. Eliot's antics, as readers of The Waste-land have somewhat painfully discovered....Why, too, should he [the reader] grub about The Waste-land to root up the dubious truffles of Mr. Eliot's scholarship?

Writings on Shakespeare
Brown had a particular interest in Shakespeare, publishing several books about his life and career, and one on the poet's love life. He also wrote a play about Shakespeare's lost love Anne Whateley in 1937, published in 1947, and broadcast on the BBC in 1953, starring Irene Worth as Anne and John Gregson as Shakespeare.

Linguistics Observations
Brown showed an interest in grammar and the use of words from his earliest writings. His 1920s essay "Winning Out", published in The Saturday Review, lightly criticizes an observed trend coming from America to adorn verbs with prepositions. Brown went on to write an immensely popular series of fifteen books on the subject of how words are used and called attention to unusual features of language use with humor and charm.

Editorship of The Observer
In February 1942, J. L. Garvin was forced out after 34 years as editor of The Observer because of a political dispute with the paper's owner, Waldorf Astor. After a succession of temporary editors, Brown was named as Garvin's successor in August. The paper at the time was undergoing considerable changes spearheaded by Waldorf's son, David Astor, with the introduction of new writers, many of them talented émigrés from the Continent, and an ideological shift from an independent conservative stance to a far more liberal one. Brown's appointment was widely viewed as short-term, with Astor waiting in the wings to succeed him and already performing as many of the duties as editor as his war service permitted. Though uncomfortable with many of the new writers (possibly because of his growing political conservatism) Brown left the political side of The Observer to Astor and the paper's assistant editor, Donald Tyerman, and concentrated on the paper's coverage of cultural matters. Brown served as editor until David Astor officially succeeded him in 1948, after which he continued as The Observer'''s drama critic until he was replaced by Kenneth Tynan in 1954.

Final years
Brown spent his final years concentrating on writing books. He would eventually publish over 75 books covering a wide range of topics and genres, but he was best known for his works on literature and the English language. He was chairman of the British Drama League from 1954 to 1962 and a fellow of the Royal Society of Literature, and he was named a CBE in 1957. He died in London in 1974.

Works
Word seriesA Word in Your Ear (1942)Just Another Word (1943)I Give You My Word (1945)Say the Word (1947)No Idle Words (1948)Having the Last Word (1950)I Break my Word (1951)A Word in Edgeways (1953)Chosen Words (1955)Words in Our Time (1958)Words in Season (1961)A Ring of Words (1967)A Rhapsody of Words (1969)Random Words (1971)A Charm of Names (1972)Words on the Level (1973)

Individual booksYears of Plenty (1915)Security (1916)The Meaning of Democracy (1919)Lighting-up Time (1920)English Political Theory (1920)H. G. Wells (1923)Smithfield Preserv'd: Or, The Divill a Vegetarian (1926)Masques and Phases (1926)First Player: The Origin of Drama (1927)Parties of the Play (1928)Now on View (1929)Essays of To-day and Yesterday (1929)Puck Our Peke (1931)I Commit to the Flames (1934)Master Sanguine: Who Always Believed What He Was Told (1934)The Heart of England (1935)Marine Parade (1937)Life within Reason (1939)This Shakespeare Industry: Amazing Monument (1939)British Thought 1947 (1947)Observer Profiles (1948)Shakespeare (1949)Shakespeare Memorial Theatre 1948–50 (1950) (with Anthony Quayle)Winter in London: An Excursion into the Pleasure of a Rich and Fascinating City (1951)Summer in Scotland (1952)Word for Word: An Encyclopaedia of Beer (1953)The Way of My World (1954)Balmoral: The History of a Home (1954)Shakespeare Memorial Theatre 1954–56 (1956)Dark Ladies (1957)J. B. Priestley (1957)Royal Homes in Colour (1958)A Book of England (National Anthologies) (1958)William Shakespeare (1958)Shakespeare in His Time (1960)London (1960)A Book of London (1961)Stately Homes in Colour (1961)Mind Your Language (1962)A Book of Marriage (1963)How Shakespeare Spent the Day (1963)Dickens in His Time (1963)What Is a Play? (1964)Shakespeare and His World (1964)Doctor Johnson and His World (1965)Shaw in His Time (1965)Jane Austen and Her World (1966)William Shakespeare (1968)The Women in Shakespeare's Life (1968)Anton Chekhov (1970)Shakespeare and the Actors (1970)W. Somerset Maugham (1970) Charles Dickens: A Collection of Contemporary Documents (1970)Charles Dickens: 1812-1870 (1970)
Dickens and His World (1970)
Old and Young: A Personal Summing up (1971)
Conan Doyle: A Biography of the Creator of Sherlock Holmes (1972)

Editor
The Bedside 'Guardian': A Selection by Ivor Brown from the Manchester Guardian 1951–1952
The Bedside 'Guardian' 2: A Selection by Ivor Brown from the Manchester Guardian 1952–1953
The Bedside 'Guardian' 3: A Selection by Ivor Brown from the Manchester Guardian 1953–1954
The Bedside 'Guardian' 4: A Selection by Ivor Brown from the Manchester Guardian 1954–1955
The Bedside 'Guardian' 5: A Selection by Ivor Brown from the Manchester Guardian 1955–1956
The Bedside 'Guardian' 6: A Selection by Ivor Brown from the Manchester Guardian 1956–1957
The Bedside 'Guardian' 7: A Selection by Ivor Brown from the Manchester Guardian 1957–1958

References

External links
 
 
 I Commit to the Flames
 Mind Your Language

British newspaper editors
The Guardian journalists
1891 births
1974 deaths
Alumni of Balliol College, Oxford
Commanders of the Order of the British Empire
The Observer people
People from Penang
People educated at Cheltenham College
Presidents of the Critics' Circle
British people in British Malaya